Brigadier Sir Iltyd Nicholl Clayton  (15 September 1886 – 30 June 1955) was a British Army officer notable for his attachment to the Middle East Office in Cairo during and after World War II and his involvement in the formation of Arab League and formulation of post-war British policy in the Middle East. Clayton also wanted to create the Greater Syria which would enhance the British dominating influence in the Middle East against Soviet threats, in addition to opposing an independent Jewish State in Palestine.

Biography
Clayton was born in Sandown, Isle of Wight, the son of Lt. Col. William Lewis Nicholl Clayton and Maria Martha Pilkington. He was educated at Lancing College and the Royal Military Academy in Woolwich, United Kingdom. He was commissioned into the Royal Garrison Artillery in 1906 and promoted lieutenant in 1909. He served in the World War I, reaching the rank of Major. After post-war spells in Iraq and Cairo, he served as Regimental Lieutenant-Colonel of the Royal Artillery from 1934 to 1938 and retired in 1939. Recalled to service during the Second World War, he served as Advisor on Arab Affairs to the British Government (1943–45). He was later Special Advisor to Head of British Middle East Office and served as Minister attached to the British Embassy in Cairo (1947–48).

He was appointed a Commander of the Order of the British Empire (CBE) in the 1927 Birthday Honours and a Knight Commander of the same Order (KBE) in the 1949 New Year Honours.

Personal life
His older brother, Gilbert, was also a British Army intelligence officer and colonial administrator.

He married Marjorie Clemence Duke, daughter of Sir William Duke. They had two daughters and one son. He died in Weobley, Herefordshire, aged 68.

References

Bibliography

External links
 Index reference to the Sir Iltyd Clayton collection, held by St Anthony's College, University of Oxford.

1886 births
1955 deaths
People from Sandown
People educated at Lancing College
Graduates of the Royal Military Academy, Woolwich
Royal Artillery officers
Knights Commander of the Order of the British Empire
Royal Garrison Artillery officers
British expatriates in Egypt